Deerfield is a census-designated place (CDP) in Augusta County, Virginia, United States. The population as of the 2010 Census was 132. It has a very low population density, as it is a small unincorporated rural area.  The Deerfield mall is the main store of the town. Deerfield consists of farms, hunting areas, old plantation houses, and scenic views of the mountains.  Deer, bear, and other forms of wildlife fill the area.  Deerfield has its own post office, fire department, rescue squad, dump, and a historic school house. Students who live in Deerfield attend Churchville Elementary School, Beverley Manor Middle School, and Buffalo Gap High School.

The Deerfield School was listed on the National Register of Historic Places in 1986.

Climate
The climate in this area is characterized by hot, humid summers and generally mild to cool winters.  According to the Köppen Climate Classification system, Deerfield has a humid subtropical climate, abbreviated "Cfa" on climate maps.

References

Census-designated places in Augusta County, Virginia